The next Andalusian regional election will be held no later than Tuesday, 30 June 2026, to elect the 13th Parliament of the autonomous community of Andalusia. All 109 seats in the Parliament will be up for election.

Overview

Electoral system
The Parliament of Andalusia is the devolved, unicameral legislature of the autonomous community of Andalusia, having legislative power in regional matters as defined by the Spanish Constitution of 1978 and the regional Statute of Autonomy, as well as the ability to vote confidence in or withdraw it from a regional president.

Voting for the Parliament is on the basis of universal suffrage, which comprises all nationals over 18 years of age, registered in Andalusia and in full enjoyment of their political rights. The "begged" or expat vote system, requiring Andalusians abroad to apply for voting before being permitted to vote, was repealed in 2022. The 109 members of the Parliament of Andalusia are elected using the D'Hondt method and a closed list proportional representation, with an electoral threshold of three percent of valid votes—which includes blank ballots—being applied in each constituency. Seats are allocated to constituencies, corresponding to the provinces of Almería, Cádiz, Córdoba, Granada, Huelva, Jaén, Málaga and Seville, with each being allocated an initial minimum of eight seats and the remaining 45 being distributed in proportion to their populations (provided that the number of seats in each province does not exceed two times that of any other).

As a result of the aforementioned allocation, each constituency is provisionally entitled the following seats for the next regional election:

The use of the D'Hondt method may result in a higher effective threshold, depending on the district magnitude.

Election date
The term of the Parliament of Andalusia expires four years after the date of its previous election, unless it is dissolved earlier. The election decree shall be issued no later than the twenty-fifth day prior to the date of expiry of parliament and published on the following day in the Official Gazette of the Regional Government of Andalusia (BOJA), with election day taking place on the fifty-fourth day from publication barring any date within from 1 July to 31 August. The previous election was held on 19 June 2022, which means that the legislature's term will expire on 19 June 2026. The election decree must be published in the BOJA no later than 26 May 2026, with the election taking place on the fifty-fourth day from publication, setting the latest (theoretical) possible election date for the Parliament on Sunday, 19 July 2026. However, due to the summer temporary ban on elections, the latest real date for an election to be held is Tuesday, 30 June 2026.

The president has the prerogative to dissolve the Parliament of Andalusia and call a snap election, provided that no motion of no confidence is in process and that dissolution does not occur before one year has elapsed since the previous one. In the event of an investiture process failing to elect a regional president within a two-month period from the first ballot, the Parliament is to be automatically dissolved and a fresh election called.

Parliamentary composition
The table below shows the composition of the parliamentary groups at the present time.

Parties and candidates
The electoral law allows for parties and federations registered in the interior ministry, coalitions and groupings of electors to present lists of candidates. Parties and federations intending to form a coalition ahead of an election are required to inform the relevant Electoral Commission within ten days of the election call, whereas groupings of electors need to secure the signature of at least one percent of the electorate in the constituencies for which they seek election, disallowing electors from signing for more than one list of candidates.

Below is a list of the main parties and electoral alliances which will likely contest the election:

Opinion polls
The tables below list opinion polling results in reverse chronological order, showing the most recent first and using the dates when the survey fieldwork was done, as opposed to the date of publication. Where the fieldwork dates are unknown, the date of publication is given instead. The highest percentage figure in each polling survey is displayed with its background shaded in the leading party's colour. If a tie ensues, this is applied to the figures with the highest percentages. The "Lead" column on the right shows the percentage-point difference between the parties with the highest percentages in a poll.

Voting intention estimates
The table below lists weighted voting intention estimates. Refusals are generally excluded from the party vote percentages, while question wording and the treatment of "don't know" responses and those not intending to vote may vary between polling organisations. When available, seat projections determined by the polling organisations are also displayed below (or in place of) the voting estimates in a smaller font; 55 seats are required for an absolute majority in the Parliament of Andalusia.

Voting preferences
The table below lists raw, unweighted voting preferences.

References
Opinion poll sources

Other

Andalusia
2020s